Anthony John Charles Donelan (1846 – 12 September 1924) was a soldier and Irish nationalist politician.  He was a Member of Parliament (MP) for East Cork from 1892 to 1910, and for East Wicklow from 1911 to 1918.

Donelan came from an Irish Protestant landlord family who had extensive property and a strong military tradition.  His father was Colonel of the 48th Regiment, and his grandfather was killed in action at the Battle of Talavera in the Peninsular War. His mother was Sarah, daughter of John Johnson of Holbeach, Lincolnshire.  Donelan was educated privately and at the Royal Military College, Sandhurst, and was commissioned into the Norfolk Regiment, being stationed for some time at Corfu.

He was elected unopposed at East Cork as an Anti-Parnellite MP in the general election 1892 and 1895, taking his seat in the House of Commons
in the Parliament of the United Kingdom of Great Britain and Ireland. He continued to be elected unopposed as a Nationalist in the general elections 1900, 1906 and January 1910, after the reunification of the Irish Parliamentary Party in 1900.  However, in December 1910 election he was opposed by William O'Brien, whose All-for-Ireland Party was strong in Co. Cork.  Although Donelan defeated O’Brien by 3,173 votes to 1,834, he was unseated following an election petition.  He then swapped seats with John Muldoon at East Wicklow, Donelan and Muldoon both being returned unopposed at by-elections in July 1911.

For many years Donelan was Chief Whip of the Irish Party.  He retired from Parliament at the general election in December 1918.  His funeral at Midleton, Co. Cork, on Sunday 14 September 1924 was attended by thousands of people.

Notes

Sources
 Dod's Parliamentary Companion
 Irish Times, 13 and 15 September 1924
 The Times (London), 17 September 1924
 Brian M. Walker (ed.), Parliamentary Election Results in Ireland, 1801–1922, Dublin, Royal Irish Academy, 1978

External links
 

1846 births
1924 deaths
Protestant Irish nationalists
Irish Parliamentary Party MPs
Anti-Parnellite MPs
Members of the Parliament of the United Kingdom for County Cork constituencies (1801–1922)
Members of the Parliament of the United Kingdom for County Wicklow constituencies (1801–1922)
Politicians from County Cork
UK MPs 1892–1895
UK MPs 1895–1900
UK MPs 1900–1906
UK MPs 1906–1910
UK MPs 1910
UK MPs 1910–1918
Graduates of the Royal Military College, Sandhurst